About Some Meaningless Events is a 1974 docu-fiction film directed by Mostafa Derkaoui. Moroccan authorities banned the film after its first and only screening in Paris. Widely believed to have been lost, negative prints were uncovered in the archives of the Filmoteca De Catalunya in Barcelona in 2016 by researcher Lea Morin. The prints were restored and the film was then streamed online and presented at a number of events and film festivals, including the Marseille Festival of Documentary Film, MoMa's Doc Fortnight 2021 festival and the 69th Berlin International Film Festival.

Cast 

 Abdellatif Nour
 Abbas Fassi- Fihri
 Hamid Zoughi
 Mostafa Dziri,
 Aïcha Saâdoun
 Mohamed Derham
 Salaheddine Benmoussa
 Abdelkader Moutaâ
 Khalid Jamaï
 Chafik Shimi
 Malika El Mesrar
 Omar Chenbout
 Mostafa Nissabouri

Synopsis 
A group of filmmakers in search of a theme to deal with interview young bypassers in Casablanca about their expectations and their relationship to Moroccan cinema. When they witness a crime committed by an exploited dockworker, who involuntarily kills his mobster boss, they decide to investigate the crime's motives, which ultimately leads them to some deep reflection on their role of cinema in Moroccan society.

References 

Moroccan drama films
Moroccan documentary films